Presiento Que Voy a Llorar (I Feel Like I'm Going to Cry) is the sixth studio album released by Los Bukis in 1981.

Track listing

All songs written and composed by Marco Antonio Solís except for Que Las Mantenga el Gobierno, and Quisiera Mejor Morir

References

1981 albums
Los Bukis albums
Fonovisa Records albums